Alireza Esteki (born October 6, 1975 in Isfahan), one of the champions and coaches of boxing and bodybuilding, is the coach of the Iranian national boxing team.

Start of activity 
He entered boxing in 1993 when he was 16 years old due to his weight and encouragement from his father. His perseverance and interest caused him to participate in national competitions in 1372 and a year later he won the title of the third place in the national championship in Damghan.

He joined the national boxing team from 1998 to 2005, and although the national team did not send many players to competitions, it also has a second Asian medal in Malaysia.

Coaching 
Alireza Esteki has spent part of his coaching career in Kazakhstan, and coached former wrestling champion Amir Ali Akbari, preparing him for the World Boxing Championships.

Education 
Master of Strategic Physical Education Management

Coaching qualifications 

 Bodybuilding coaching from the National Olympic Committee
 Professional boxing coaching certificate from the UK
 1-star and 2-star international certification from IBA (World Boxing Federation)

Honors 

 Win 2 gold medals, 4 silver medals and 1 bronze medal.
 Asian silver medalist from Malaysia in 2002.

Resume 

 14 years of coaching and head coaching in Iranian national boxing teams
 7 years of bodybuilding, technical coach of the adult national team
 1 year as the head coach of the national youth team in 2014
 1 year head coach of Omid national team
 1 year head coach of Iran's national boxing team (adults)
 8 years member of the technical committee of the Boxing Federation

See also 

 Danial Shahbakhsh

Press coverage 

 Tasnim
 Isna
 Irna
 Jame Jam
 Fars News
 Mehr News
 Mashregh News

External links 

 
 Persian Wikipedia
 2002 Asian Amateur Boxing Championships
 Iran national amateur boxing athletes

Sources 

Iranian bodybuilders
People from Tehran
Living people
Boxers (sport)
1975 births